Claudio Padoan (born 18 March 1948) is an Italian rower. He competed in the men's coxed four event at the 1972 Summer Olympics.

References

1948 births
Living people
Italian male rowers
Olympic rowers of Italy
Rowers at the 1972 Summer Olympics
Place of birth missing (living people)